Haruka Yoshimura is a Japanese voice actress.

Haruka Yoshimura may refer to:
Haruka Yoshimura (politician), member of the Fukuoka Prefectural Assembly 
Haruka Yoshimura, a Japanese wrestler; see Makoto (wrestler) and Ray (wrestler)